Cotrifazid is a treatment and prophylaxis for malaria consisting of a multiple complex combination of rifampicin, isoniazid, sulfamethoxazole, and trimethoprim.

References

Antimalarial agents